Dunama Dabbalemi, or Dounama Dibbalém, of the Sayfawa dynasty, was the mai (king) of the Kanem Empire, in present-day Chad, from 1210 to 1224.

A fervent Muslim, Dabbalemi initiated diplomatic exchanges with sultans in North Africa and apparently arranged for the establishment of a special hostel in Cairo to facilitate pilgrimages to Mecca. In particular the historian Ibn Khaldun, who remembers him as "King of Kanem and Lord of Bornu", reports a Kanem embassy in 1257 to Tunisia. During his reign, he declared jihad against the surrounding tribes and initiated an extended period of conquest, allegedly arriving to have under his command a cavalry 40.000 strong. After consolidating their territory around Lake Chad the Fezzan region (in present-day Libya) fell under Kanem's authority, and the empire's influence extended westward to Kano (in present-day Nigeria), eastward to Ouaddaï, and southward to the Adamawa grasslands (in present-day Cameroon). Through his wars, he captured many slaves that he sold to the North African traders as the main item of the trans-Saharan trade.

He is also credited with destroying the mune, a mysterious object believed to possess unknown powers, possibly a symbol of divine kingship. It was probably destroyed so to cancel an important symbol of pre-Muslim beliefs, and to prove his determination in contrasting what he saw as the lax faith of his predecessors. The action generated some reprobation, as it is reported that the destruction opened a period of civil strife within the kingdom.

Dabbalemi devised a system to reward military commanders with authority over the people they conquered. This system, however, tempted military officers to pass their positions to their sons, thus transforming the office from one based on achievement and loyalty to the mai into one based on hereditary nobility. Dabbalemi was able to suppress this tendency, but it was to erupt after his death, provoking the loss of most of Dabbalemi's conquests.

References

General
Barkindo, Bawuro, "The early states of the Central Sudan: Kanem, Borno and some of their neighbours to c. 1500 A.D.", in: J. Ajayi und M. Crowder (ed.), History of West Africa, vol. I, 3. ed. Harlow 1985, 225-254.
Chad: A Country Study
 Lange, Dierk: "The Mune-symbol as the Ark of the Covenant between Duguwa and Sefuwa", Borno Museum Society Newsletter, 66/67 (2006), 84-106.
Nehemia Levtzion and John Hopkins: Corpus of Early Arabic Sources for West African History, Cambridge 1981.

See also
Kanem Empire
Sayfawa
Chronology of the Sefuwa (Kanem-Bornu)

Rulers of the Kanem Empire
13th-century monarchs in Africa